Benny Reid (born October 7, 1980) is a jazz saxophonist, music producer, and composer.

Reid was born in Westfield, New Jersey, and his parents exposed him to the music of John Coltrane and Miles Davis. His high school teacher was Andy Fusco, saxophonist with the Buddy Rich band. Reid cited as his biggest saxophone influences Stan Getz, Joe Henderson, and Paul Desmond. In 2002, he graduated from the music program at Indiana University. In 2008 he graduated with a Master's degree from Queens College. Reid also studied with Barry Harris, Eric Alexander, Mike LeDonne, Chris Potter, and Dick Oatts.

Reid's first album as leader, Findings, was released in 2007 by Concord Records. His second, Escaping Shadows, includes a cover version of "Always and Forever" by Pat Metheny.

Reid released Follow The Leader on Fat Beats, a reimagined work of the iconic Eric B. & Rakim album of the same name which went on to achieve number one status on two Billboard charts.

Reid is active composing and performing themes for national commercials and music in film and television.

Most recently Reid scored the Nas directed Showtime series Supreme Team alongside Havoc of Mobb Deep.

References

External links 
 Official site

Living people
American jazz alto saxophonists
American male saxophonists
Songwriters from New Jersey
Indiana University alumni
People from Westfield, New Jersey
Concord Records artists
1980 births
Place of birth missing (living people)
21st-century American saxophonists
21st-century American male musicians
American male jazz musicians
American male songwriters